A cardo is a north–south-oriented street in ancient Roman city planning.

Cardo may also refer to:

People

Cardo (name)
Cardo (record producer) (born 1984), American producer and rapper

Places
 Cardo (Gozón), a civil parish in Asturias, Spain
 Cardo-Torgia, a commune in the Corse-du-Sud department of France

Other uses
 Cardo (TV series), Spanish TV series
 Carbazole 1,9a-dioxygenase, an enzyme
 Cardo polymer
 Cardo, a Bembo-like open-source font
 A goat cheese produced by Mary Holbrook
 Cardo Dalisay, protagonist of Philippine TV series Ang Probinsyano

See also

Carlo (name)
Kardo (disambiguation)